The National Register Information System (NRIS) is a database of properties that have been listed on the United States National Register of Historic Places. The database includes more than 84,000 entries of historic sites that are currently listed on the National Register, that were previously listed and later removed, or that are pending listing. The database includes approximately 45 pieces of data for each listed property. Accuracy of the NRIS database may be imperfect. For example, a 2004 paper addressed accuracy of spatial location data for part of the NRIS content.

History
Efforts to digitize the database began as early as 1968, but the database was not fully digitized until 1986. By 1994 it had come to be used in answering more than 4,000 public queries per year.

Availability
A search interface within the National Park Service's NPS Focus system provides access to a skeletal record of NRIS data, as well as to photographs and documents describing properties listed on the National Register. The skeletal record includes a simplified set of the information in NRIS about all sites listed through August 2012. The NPS Focus search screen allows searching by NRHP listing name or other property identifiers.

References

External links
 
  NOTE: the database does not include the following states: Arkansas, Illinois, Massachusetts, Michigan, Missouri, North Carolina, New York, Pennsylvania, Ohio, Texas, and Virginia.
 
 
  Spreadsheets available for download.
  "All of our records will eventually be in the National Archives. Right now NARA has the states of: Alabama, Alaska, Arizona, Arkansas, Colorado, Delaware, Florida, Georgia, Hawaii, Idaho, Illinois, Indiana, Iowa, Louisiana, Maine, Massachusetts, Michigan, Minnesota, Mississippi, Missouri, Montana, Nebraska, Nevada, New Hampshire, New Mexico, New York, North Dakota, North Carolina, Ohio, Oklahoma, Oregon, Pennsylvania, Rhode Island, South Dakota, Texas, Utah, Vermont, Virginia, Washington, West Virginia, Wisconsin, Wyoming. (and more will be added.)" as of 2018-09-18
 
  Geospatial Dataset — (Code: 2210280).
 

Geographical databases
Government databases in the United States